The Blue Icefalls are steep icefalls of blue ice on the west margin of Forbidden Plateau, Danco Coast. They were named by the Polish Antarctic Expedition in about 1995.

References

See also 
 Locate articles of Icefalls in geographic region

Icefalls of Antarctica
Bodies of ice of Graham Land
Poland and the Antarctic
Danco Coast